The M99 is a short metropolitan route in Johannesburg, South Africa. For its entire route, it parallels the R24 Highway (Albertina Sisulu Freeway) in the City of Ekurhuleni Metropolitan Municipality.

Route 
The M99 begins at a junction with the M57 Road (Pretoria Road) near O. R. Tambo International Airport in the southern part of Kempton Park. It begins by going eastwards towards the airport and at the next junction, the M99 turns north, then west, via a left turn to pass under the M57 and head westwards.

It heads west-south-west as Electron Avenue, parallel to the R24 Highway (Albertina Sisulu Freeway), to form the northern border of the southernmost suburb of Kempton Park (Isando Industrial Area) and reach a junction with the M39 Road (Isando Road). Shortly after, it reaches a junction with the M59 Road (Lazarus Mawela Road).

The M99 continues west-south-west as Herman Street, still parallel to the R24, to form the northern border of the northernmost suburbs of Germiston (Klopper Park and Meadowdale) before entering the suburb of Meadowbrook at the north-eastern corner of Bedfordview (just south of Edenvale), where it reaches its end at a junction with the M37 Road (Lungile Mtshali Road).

References 

Streets and roads of Johannesburg
Metropolitan routes in Johannesburg